Yakh Kārēz is a village in Kandahar Province, in southern Afghanistan. It is also called Yakh Kāṟēz, Yakh Kārīz, Yak Karez.

See also
Kandahar Province

References

Populated places in Kandahar Province